Diocese of Johannesburg may refer to:

 the Anglican Diocese of Johannesburg
 the Roman Catholic Archdiocese of Johannesburg